General Menzies may refer to:

Charles Menzies (Royal Marines officer) (1783–1866), Royal Marines general
Robert Menzies (British Army officer) (born 1944), British Army lieutenant general
Stewart Menzies (1890–1968), British Army major general